Turtle Bay is an album by flautist Herbie Mann recorded in 1971 and 1973 and released on the Atlantic label.

Reception 

The Allmusic site awarded the album 3 stars stating: "Herbie Mann goes back to the well of soul on this LP and comes up with another tastefully funky selection of rock/R&B hits mixed with a few originals of his own. ... Herbie's own flute work is often low-key, maybe even a bit lazy, but he is audibly sympathetic with the material".

Track listing 
All compositions by Herbie Mann except where noted.
 "Family Affair" (Sylvester Stewart) – 3:02
 "Never Ending Song of Love" (Delaney Bramlett) – 5:48
 "Rainy Night in Georgia" (Tony Joe White) – 3:56
 "(Just an Old) Balalaika Love Song" – 3:46
 "Reverend Lee" (Eugene McDaniels) – 3:00
 "Turtle Bay" – 2:45
 "In Memory of Elizabeth Reed" (Dickey Betts; arranged by William Eaton) – 3:36
 "A Theme from "Cries And Whispers"" (Frédéric Chopin) – 3:24
 "Do It Again" (Walter Becker, Donald Fagen) – 2:59
 "Now I've Found a Lady (Soul Rachanga)" (arranged by Herbie Mann) – 3:36
 "Happier Than the Morning Sun" (Stevie Wonder) – 2:59
Recorded at Atlantic Recording Studios, NYC on December 20, 1971 (track 2), December 21, 1971 (track 3) and December 22, 1971 (tracks 1, 4 & 5) and at Regent Sound Studios, NYC on March 9, 1973 (tracks 6–11)

Personnel 
Herbie Mann – flute, alto flute (track 3)
Pat Rebillot – piano, electric piano, organ, arrangements
Jerry Friedman (tracks 6–11), David Spinozza (tracks 1–5) – guitar
Jerry Jemmott (tracks 1–5) Willie Weeks (tracks 6–11) – bass
Charles Collins (tracks 6, 8, 10 & 11), Reggie Ferguson (tracks 1–5, 7 & 9) – drums
Ralph MacDonald - percussion
Tessie Coen – congas (tracks 6 & 7)
Gene Orloff, Gerald Tarack – violin (tracks 8, 10 & 11)
Selwart Clarke – viola (tracks 8, 10 & 11)
Kermit Moore – cello (tracks 8, 10 & 11)
Gene Bianco (tracks 1–5), Corky Hale (track 8) – harp
Technical
Jimmy Douglass – engineer
Don Brautigam – cover illustration
Joel Brodsky – photography
Paula Bisacca – art direction, design

References 

Herbie Mann albums
1973 albums
Atlantic Records albums
Albums produced by Arif Mardin
Albums with cover art by Joel Brodsky